Stenocolus is a genus of forest stream beetles in the family Eulichadidae. There is one described species in Stenocolus, S. scutellaris.

References

Further reading

 

Byrrhoidea
Articles created by Qbugbot